Miguel Barrenechea (born 17 October 1947) is a Mexican former sports shooter. He competed in the trap event at the 1968 Summer Olympics.

References

1947 births
Living people
Mexican male sport shooters
Olympic shooters of Mexico
Shooters at the 1968 Summer Olympics
Sportspeople from Tamaulipas
People from Matamoros, Tamaulipas
20th-century Mexican people